Susan Sanford Blades is a Canadian novelist and short story writer. She is most noted for her debut novel Fake It So Real, which won the 2021 ReLit Award for Fiction and was shortlisted for the 2021 Ethel Wilson Fiction Prize.

A resident of Victoria, British Columbia, she has also published short stories in literary magazines. Her story "The Rest of Him" was a longlisted nominee for the Journey Prize in 2020.

References

External links

21st-century Canadian novelists
21st-century Canadian short story writers
21st-century Canadian women writers
Canadian women novelists
Canadian women short story writers
Writers from Victoria, British Columbia
Living people
Year of birth missing (living people)